Trimble is an unincorporated community on the Animas River in La Plata County, in the U.S. state of Colorado.

History
A post office called Trimble was established in 1883, and remained in operation until 1900. The community was named after Frank Trimble, a local cattleman.

See also

References

External links

Unincorporated communities in La Plata County, Colorado
Unincorporated communities in Colorado